Tetragonoderus thunbergi is a species of beetle in the family Carabidae. It was described by Crotch in 1870.

References

thunbergi
Beetles described in 1870